The naked-back knifefishes are a family (Gymnotidae) of knifefishes  found only in fresh waters of Central America and South America. All have organs adapted to the sensastion of bioelectricity. The family has about 43 valid species in two genera.
These fish are nocturnal and mostly occur in quiet waters from deep rivers to swamps. In strongly flowing waters, they may bury themselves.

Physical characteristics
Like the other gymnotiforms, gymnotids have classic knifefish bodies. The body is long and eel-like, the dorsal fin and pelvic fins are absent, and the anal fin is extremely long and used for movement.

The sole member of Electrophorus is the electric eel, which produces both strong (up to 600 volts) and weak (<1 V) electric discharges, for use in predation and communication/navigation, respectively. The electric eel is the largest of the gymnotiform fishes, growing up to more than  length.

These knife fishes also use electricity to assist in their movement and navigation in the water due to their limited vision.

Genera 
According to FishBase, there are 43 species in two genera: 

 Electrophorus (3 species)
 Gymnotus (40 species)

Historically, Electrophorus was in a separate family Electrophoridae and ITIS continues to do this, but this is contradicted by available evidence and not followed by other authorities.

References

 
Weakly electric fish
Fish of South America
Fish of Central America